Maged El-Kedwany aka Maged Nabil Elkedwani  اى ماجد نبيل الكدوانى(: born: 10 December 1967) is an Egyptian actor. He began acting in the 1990s, playing supporting roles. He won the Muhr Arab - Feature Best Actor Award for his role in 678 from Dubai International Film Festival. He's worked on dozens of films, among them are some of the most well-known films of the 1990s, like Afareet el-Asphalt (Asphalt Ghosts) in 1996 and Saidi fe Gamea al-Amrikeya (Saidi at the American University) in 1998. His other films include Harameya Ki-Gi-To (Ki-Gi-To Thieves), Harameya fe Thailand (Thieves in Thailand), Al-Ragel al-Abyad al-Motawast (Average White Guy), and Khaly min Kolesterol (Cholesterol-Free). In 2012, he appeared in two high-profile movies, Hafla Montasif al-Leil (Midnight Party) and Saaa we Nos (Hour and a Half). Amongst the theatrical productions that he has performed in are “Pallo” and “Diwan Al Baqar”. Maged has also made several television appearances, which include roles in “Nahnu la Nazra Al Shawk”, “Al Farar Men Al Hob”, “Al Shara’a Al Jadeed”, “Zayzenia” and “Arabesque”.

Personal life 
Maged El Kedwany was born in 1967 in the district of Shubra, Cairo, Egypt. At a young age, Maged was brought up in Kuwait till the age of 18. He began his professional career while studying design at the Faculty of Fine Arts. He began acting in a number of amateur plays, which led to him being cast in various TV shows like Qanfad (Hedgehog) and Nahnu la Nazre el-Shook. Thereafter he enrolled in the Institute of Theatrical Arts and graduated in 1995. He currently lives in El Rehab city.

Filmography

 Afareet el-Asphalt (Asphalt Ghosts) (1996)
 Thieves in KG2 (2001)
 Thieves in Thailand (2003)
 Askar fil-Mu'askar (Soldiers in the Camp) (2003)
 Teer enta (You Fly) (2010)
 678 (2010)
 Asmaa (2011)
 Before the Summer Crowds (2016)
The Crime (2022)

See also 

 Cinema of Egypt

References

External links 

1967 births
Coptic Orthodox Christians from Egypt
Living people
Best Actor Muhr Award winners